Kim Sung-joo (born February 16, 1994) is a South Korean singer and actor. Kim debuted as a member of South Korean-Chinese band UNIQ in 2014. Kim made his television debut in the romantic Chinese drama Magical Space-time (2016) and his film debut in MBA Partners (2016). He is best known for his supporting roles in Live Up to Your Name (2017) and My Secret Terrius (2018).

Career

Pre-debut
He joined YG Entertainment as a trainee. He was part of the original lineup for Winner, but that didn't work out. He's still close friends with Jinwoo and Seungyoon.

A new opportunity arose and he ended up joining UNIQ, a Korean-Chinese group under Yuehua. He still continued to train at YG Entertainment since the two companies were collaborating with this new group. He trained for a total of 5 years before his official debut.

2014: Career beginnings

Kim debuted in 2014 with the South Korean-Chinese boy band group Uniq with the song "Falling in Love".

Kim promoted with Uniq for a few years, where he landed his first acting role in 2016, together with his band mates in the Chinese film, MBA Partners, where Kim and Wang Yibo playing the lead roles, while Zhou Yixuan, Li Wenhan and Cho Seung-youn making cameos.

Kim then starred in the Chinese drama, Magical Space-time before his second film in Kill Me Please.

2017: Rising popularity with supporting roles
Kim was cast in The Liar and His Lover where he played "Yoo Si-hyun", the leader and vocalist of the popular band "Crude Play" in the series. He also starred in the tvN's drama Live Up to Your Name.

In September 2018, it was reported that Kim would be joining MBC's drama, My Secret Terrius, where he will play Ra Do-woo, a genius hacker who is rebellious.

Kim enlisted for his mandatory military service on 9th March 2020.
Kim completed his military service and has been discharged as of 16th September 2021.

Discography

solo single

other single

Filmography

Film

Television series

Television shows

References

External links

1994 births
Living people
Uniq (band) members
21st-century South Korean male actors
South Korean male television actors
South Korean male film actors
South Korean male idols
South Korean pop singers
21st-century South Korean singers
People from Incheon